Transition metal thiolate complexes are metal complexes containing thiolate ligands.  Thiolates are ligands that can be classified as soft Lewis bases. Therefore, thiolate ligands coordinate most strongly to metals that behave as soft Lewis acids as opposed to those that behave as hard Lewis acids.  Most complexes contain other ligands in addition to thiolate, but many homoleptic complexes are known with only thiolate ligands.  The amino acid cysteine has a thiol functional group, consequently many cofactors in proteins and enzymes feature cysteinate-metal cofactors.

Synthesis
Metal thiolate complexes are commonly prepared by reactions of metal complexes with thiols (RSH), thiolates (RS−), and disulfides (R2S2). The salt metathesis reaction route is common.  In this method, an alkali metal thiolate is treated with a transition metal halide to produce an alkali metal halide and the metal thiolate complex:
LiSC6H5  +  CuI   →    Cu(SC6H5)  +  LiI

The thiol ligand can also effect protonolysis of anionic ligands, as illustrated by the formation of an organonickel thiolate from nickelocene and ethanethiol:
2 HSC2H5  +  2 Ni(C5H5)2   →    [Ni(SC2H5)(C5H5)]2  +  2 C5H6

Regarding their mechanism of formation from thiols, metal thiolate complexes can arise via deprotonation of thiol complexes.

Redox routes
Many thiolate complexes are prepared by redox reactions.  Organic disulfides oxidize low valence metals, as illustrated by the oxidation of titanocene dicarbonyl:

Some metal centers are oxidized by thiols, the coproduct being hydrogen gas:

These reactions may proceed by the oxidative addition of the thiol to Fe(0).

Thiols and especially thiolate salts are reducing agents.  Consequently, they induce redox reactions with certain transition metals.  This phenomenon is illustrated by the synthesis of cuprous thiolates from cupric precursors:
4 HSC6H5  +  2 CuO   →    2 Cu(SC6H5)  +  (C6H5S)2  +  2 H2O

Thiolate clusters of the type [Fe4S4(SR)4]2− occur in iron–sulfur proteins.  Synthetic analogues can be  prepared by combined redox and salt metathesis reactions:
4 FeCl3  +  6 NaSR  +  6 NaSH   →   Na2[Fe4S4(SR)4]  +  10 NaCl  +  4 HCl  +  H2S  +  R2S2

Structure and bonding
Divalent sulfur exhibits bond angles approaching 90°.  Such acute angles are also seen in the M-S-C angles of metal thiolates.  Having filled p-orbitals of suitable symmetry, thiolates are pi-donor ligands.  This property plays a role in the stabilization of Fe(IV) states in the enzyme cytochrome P450.

Reactions
Thiolates are relatively basic ligands, being derived from conjugate acids with pKa's of 6.5 (thiophenol) to 10.5 (butanethiol).  Consequently, thiolate ligand often bridge pairs of metals.  One example is Fe2(SCH3)2(CO)6.  Thiolate ligands, especially when nonbridging, are susceptible to attack by electrophiles including acids, alkylating agents, and oxidants.

Occurrence and applications
Metal thiolate functionality is pervasive in metalloenzymes.  Iron-sulfur proteins, blue copper proteins, and the zinc-containing enzyme liver alcohol dehydrogenase feature thiolate ligands.  Commonly thiolate is ligand is provided from the cysteine residue.   All molybdoproteins feature thiolates in the form of cysteinyl and/or molybdopterin.

References

Biochemistry
Inorganic chemistry
Coordination complexes